The men's individual all-around competition was one of eight events for male competitors in artistic gymnastics at the 1980 Summer Olympics in Moscow. The qualification and final rounds took place on July 20, 22 and 24th at the Sports Palace of the Central Lenin Stadium. There were 65 competitors from 14 nations. Each nation could enter a team of 6 gymnasts or up to 3 individual gymnasts. The event was won by Alexander Dityatin of the Soviet Union, the nation's second consecutive and fifth overall victory in the event (taking the lead for most among nations at the time). It was the second of Dityatin's 8 total medals in 1980, a record that still stands through the 2016 Games (though it has been tied twice by Michael Phelps, including his 2008 performance of 8 gold medals). Dityatin's teammate, defending gold medalist Nikolai Andrianov, finished with the silver medal. Andrianov was the 10th man to win multiple medals in the event; he would also finish the 1980 Games with a total of 15 medals over all years—most among men at the time (though behind Larisa Latynina's 18; Phelps would later shatter both those totals with 28). Bronze went to Stoyan Deltchev of Bulgaria—the first medal in the event by a gymnast not from the Soviet Union or Japan since 1952. It was Bulgaria's first-ever medal in the men's all-around. Japan, which had joined the American-led 1980 Summer Olympics boycott and did not compete, had its six-Games podium streak ended.

Background

This was the 18th appearance of the men's individual all-around. The first individual all-around competition had been held in 1900, after the 1896 competitions featured only individual apparatus events. A men's individual all-around has been held every Games since 1900.

Five of the top 10 gymnasts from the 1976 Games returned: gold medalist Nikolai Andrianov of the Soviet Union, fourth-place finisher Alexander Dityatin of the Soviet Union, sixth-place finisher Andrzej Szajna of Poland, seventh-place finisher Michael Nikolay of East Germany, and ninth-place finisher Zoltán Magyar of Hungary. The World Championships had shifted from a quadrennial (non-Olympic even years) to a biennial (odd years) event, so there had been two World Champions since the last Games: Andrianov (1978) and Dityatin (1979). Significant absences due to the American-led boycott included Kurt Thomas of the United States (second at the 1979 World Championships) and the entire Japanese team, especially Eizo Kenmotsu (second at the 1978 World Championships).

Brazil made its debut in the event. France made its 16th appearance, most among nations (moving out of a tie with Italy, not competing in the event this time).

Competition format

The competition format followed the preliminary and final format introduced in 1972, with the limit on the number of finalists per nation added in 1976. All entrants in the gymnastics competitions performed both a compulsory exercise and a voluntary exercise for each apparatus. The scores for all 12 exercises were summed to give an individual all-around preliminary score. Half of the scores from the preliminary carried over to the final, with the top 36 gymnasts advancing to the individual all-around final—except that each nation was limited to 3 finalists. There, each of the finalists performed another exercise on each apparatus. The sum of these scores plus half of the preliminary score resulted in a final total.

Each exercise was scored from 0 to 10; thus, the preliminary apparatus scores ranged from 0 to 20 each and the total preliminary score from 0 to 120. With half of the preliminary score and six more exercises scored 0 to 10, the final total was also from 0 to 120.

The preliminary exercise scores were also used for qualification for the apparatus finals.

Schedule

All times are Moscow Time (UTC+3)

Results

Sixty-eight gymnasts competed in the compulsory and optional rounds on July 20 and 22. The thirty-six highest scoring gymnasts advanced to the final on July 24. Each country was limited to three competitors in the final. Half of the points earned by each gymnast during both the compulsory and optional rounds carried over to the final. This constitutes each gymnast's "prelim" score.

References

External links
Official Olympic Report
www.gymnasticsresults.com
www.gymn-forum.net

Men's individual all-around
Men's events at the 1980 Summer Olympics